Henri Maupoil (11 July 1891 - 30 October 1971) was a French politician. He served as a member of the Chamber of Deputies from 1924 to 1936, and the French Senate from 1936 to 1944, representing Saône-et-Loire. He was also the Minister of Pensions from 7 June 1935 to 22 January 1936.

References

1891 births
1971 deaths
People from Saône-et-Loire
Politicians from Bourgogne-Franche-Comté
Radical Party (France) politicians
French Ministers of Pensions
Members of the 13th Chamber of Deputies of the French Third Republic
Members of the 14th Chamber of Deputies of the French Third Republic
Members of the 15th Chamber of Deputies of the French Third Republic
French Senators of the Third Republic
Senators of Saône-et-Loire